Multi-functional Satellite Augmentation System (MTSAT or MSAS) is a Japanese satellite based augmentation system (SBAS), i.e. a satellite navigation system which supports differential GPS (DGPS) to supplement the GPS system by reporting (then improving) on the reliability and accuracy of those signals. MSAS is operated by Japan's Ministry of Land, Infrastructure and Transport and Civil Aviation Bureau (JCAB). Tests have been accomplished successfully, MSAS for aviation use was commissioned on 27 September 2007.

The use of SBASs, such as MSAS, enables an individual GPS receiver to correct its own position, offering a much greater accuracy. Typically GPS signal accuracy is improved from some 20 meters to approximately 1.5–2 meters in both the horizontal and vertical dimensions.

MSAS provides a similar service to Wide Area Augmentation System (WAAS) in North America, European Geostationary Navigation Overlay Service (EGNOS) in Europe and System for Differential Corrections and Monitoring (SDCM) in Russia.

See also
 Multi-Functional Transport Satellite (MTSAT)
 Quasi-Zenith Satellite System (QZSS)

References

External links
Information on WAAS, EGNOS & MSAS

Navigation satellite constellations
Satellite-based augmentation systems